The Elite League was the top division of speedway league competition in the United Kingdom, governed by the Speedway Control Bureau (SCB), in conjunction with the British Speedway Promoters' Association (BSPA).  It was sponsored by Sky Sports until the end of the 2013 season. In 2016, the Elite League featured 8 teams, unlike 10 in 2014, during a season which ran between March and October. Each team had a designated race day on which they normally staged their home fixtures, and they regularly had home and away fixtures scheduled in the same week.

The Elite League operated for 20 years until British speedway was restructured with the formation of the SGB Premiership and SGB Championship.

Brief history
The British League was formed in 1965 as the sole professional speedway league in Britain, expanding in 1968 to incorporate two divisions. In 1995 & 1996 there was a single professional tier known as the Premier League (an amalgamation of the British League Division One and the British League Division Two), before the Elite League was created as a new top tier in 1997. The Championship was decided on a straight league table basis until 2001. A play-off system was introduced in 2002, with the top four in the table taking part in a knockout competition to decide the champions.

League format
Each team raced every other team in the league home and away, and then raced five teams again home and twice away, giving a total of 38 meetings. The first of these home and away fixtures are called the 'A' fixtures, the second are the 'B' fixtures.

Teams were awarded two points for a win, one point for a draw and from 2008 three points for an away win. Placings were determined by points accumulated over all matches. Where two or more teams were tied on league points, the team with the greater difference of race points scored over race points conceded was placed higher.

The top four teams qualified for the play-offs. The semi-finals were single matches with the top two league positions having home advantage (1st vs 3rd and 2nd vs 4th). Winners from the semi-finals then met in a two-legged final to decide the Elite League winner.

From 2008, promotion and relegation between the Elite League and Premier League was introduced for the first time since 1991. The team finishing last faced the Premier League play-off winner over two legs (one match at each track), with the aggregate winner taking the Elite League spot in the following season, and the losing team racing in the Premier League. There is now no relegation from the Elite League, although teams can apply to move up or down between leagues.

For 2014 it was announced that each Elite League team would field two British riders from lower leagues at reserve. These would be picked from a draft of 23 riders. Riders were picked in two rounds, with the club finishing bottom of the league in 2013 getting the first pick.

Teams

Team building
At the start of each season, teams were built up to maximum points limit. The combined Calculated Match Average (CMA) of the best five riders declared in the team was limited to an agreed figure set at the British Speedway Promoters' Association (BSPA) Annual General Meeting. For the 2015 the limit was 34.

2016 teams

Source:

Former teams

Competitions

Elite League

Champions

Elite League KOC

Craven Shield

Elite Shield

Elite League Riders' Championship

Elite League Pairs

See also
 List of United Kingdom Speedway League Champions

References

External links
Official BSPA (British Speedway Promoters Association) Homepage

Speedway leagues
Elite League